Heimkehrer (literally "homecomer") refers to World War II German prisoners of war and internees—Wehrmacht (Heer), Kriegsmarine, Luftwaffe, Waffen-SS, Ordnungspolizei, behind-the-lines Hiwi security and civilian personnel—who were repatriated to West Germany, East Germany and Austria after the war. Some of the late returnees were convicted war criminals who were subsequently tried in West Germany. 

By 1948, the number of German internees still held in captivity by major Allied powers was as follows:

United Kingdom: 435,295
United States of America: 30,976
France: 631,483
Soviet Union: 890,532

See also
Forced labor of Germans in the Soviet Union

References

  Elena Agazzi, Erhard Schütz (Hrsg.): Heimkehr: eine zentrale Kategorie der Nachkriegszeit. Geschichte, Literatur und Medien. Duncker & Humblot, Berlin 2010, .
 Hans Reichelt: Die deutschen Kriegsheimkehrer - Was hat die DDR für sie getan? Berlin 2008, 
 Wolfgang Buwert (Hrsg.): Gefangene und Heimkehrer in Frankfurt (Oder)
 Svenja Goltermann: Kriegsheimkehrer in der west-deutschen Gesellschaft, APuZ 36-37/2009, pp. 34–39
 Helmut Hirthe: Das Heimkehrerlager in Frankfurt-Gronenfelde, in: Jürgen Maerz (Hrsg.): Wir waren damals 19, Frankfurt (Oder) 1995
 Helmut Hirthe: Das Heimkehrerlager Gronenfelde - wichtige Station auf dem Weg in ein neues Leben, in: Wolfgang Buwert (Hrsg.): Gefangene und Heimkehrer in Frankfurt (Oder), Potsdam 1998. .
 Werner Kilian: Adenauers Reise nach Moskau. Freiburg im Breisgau u.a. 2005, .
 Arthur L. Smith: Die vermisste Million. Zum Schicksal deutscher Kriegsgefangener nach dem Zweiten Weltkrieg. Oldenburg, München 1992 (Schriftenreihe der Vierteljahrshefte für Zeitgeschichte; 65), .
 Dieter Riesenberger (Hrsg.): Das Deutsche Rote Kreuz, Konrad Adenauer und das Kriegsgefangenenproblem. Die Rückkehr der deutschen Kriegsgefangenen aus der Sowjetunion (1952 - 1955). Donat-Verlag, Bremen 1994 (Schriftenreihe Geschichte und Frieden, Bd. 7), .
 Dieter Riesenberger: Das Ringen um die Entlassung deutscher Kriegsgefangener aus der Sowjetunion (1952-1955), in: Dieter Riesenberger: Den Krieg überwinden. Donat-Verlag, Bremen 2008, . pp. 324–339

Aftermath of World War II in Germany
Aftermath of World War II in Austria
German prisoners of war in World War II